Luka Basi, is a Slovenian singer and songwriter. He is chiefly known for his main hit songs: Istrijanko ružo moja, Meta, Taxi, Sedam Noći, Seko Moja, and Kad vidin boga uživo, as well as his collaborations with Joško Čagalj - Jole, Lidija Bačić, Lana Jurčević, Marko Škugor, and Ljubavnici.

His first album went on sale in 2019.

Discography

Studio albums

Singles

References

External links

Living people
Slovenian pop singers
Musicians from Ljubljana
21st-century Slovenian male singers
1993 births